We (stylized as WE) is the fourth studio album by Japanese singer Leo Ieiri. It was released on July 6, 2016, through Colourful Records. The album yielded three singles, including "Hello to the World", "Bokutachi no Mirai" and the best-selling "Kimi ga Kureta Natsu".

Background and release
The album and subsequent concert tour were announced jointly on May 27, 2016. Ieri has stated that the album's title represents the mindset of unity she felt while making the record, and she described the road from her self-titled debut to the inclusive We as a "journey". According to Ieri, the album is a dedication to all the people she has met along the way as well as a show of gratitude for everything that has transpired since the beginning of her career. We was released in two formats, one CD-only version, and a limited edition including a DVD featuring her Live at Zepp 2016: Two Colours concert held on February 2, 2016 at Zepp DiverCity and the music videos to "Hello to the World" and "Bokutachi no Mirai".

Commercial performance
We entered the daily Oricon Albums Chart at number 5, where it also peaked. The album debuted at number 6, with 18,000 copies sold in its first week. It charted for seventeen weeks and sold a reported total of 34,000 copies during its run. We peaked at number 8 on the Billboard Japan Hot Albums chart and number 6 on the Top Albums Sales chart.

Track listing

Charts

Sales

References

2016 albums
Leo Ieiri albums
Colourful Records albums